K. Dhanaraju (born 3 August 1956) was a member of the 14th Lok Sabha of India. He represented the Tindivanam constituency of Tamil Nadu and is a member of the Pattali Makkal Katchi (PMK) political party.

References

1956 births
Living people
Indian Tamil people
Lok Sabha members from Tamil Nadu
India MPs 2004–2009
Pattali Makkal Katchi politicians
People from Viluppuram district